Beaumont Glacier is a broad glacier flowing in a northeast direction to the southwest part of Hilton Inlet, on the east coast of Palmer Land. The United States Antarctic Service discovered and photographed it from the air in 1940. It was resighted in 1947 by the Ronne Antarctic Research Expedition under Finn Ronne, who named it for the city of Beaumont, Texas, in recognition of the public support given to his expedition by this city and by the Tejas Chapter of the Daughters of the Republic of Texas, at Beaumont.

References
 

Glaciers of Palmer Land